The Mousetrap is a murder mystery play by Agatha Christie. The Mousetrap opened in London's West End in 1952 and ran continuously until 16 March 2020, when the stage performances had to be temporarily discontinued during the COVID-19 pandemic. It then re-opened on 17 May 2021. The longest-running West End show, it has by far the longest run of any play in the world, with its 28,915th performance having taken place as of November 2022. Attendees at St Martin's Theatre often get their photo taken beside the wooden counter (showing a count of the number of performances) in the theatre foyer. As of 2022 the play has been seen by 10 million people in London.

A "Whodunit", the play has a twist ending, which the audience are traditionally asked not to reveal after leaving the theatre. There are eight members of the cast, and by 2012 more than 400 actors and actresses had played the roles. Richard Attenborough was the original Detective Sergeant Trotter, and his wife, Sheila Sim, the first Mollie Ralston – owner of Monkswell Manor guesthouse. However since then few of the cast have been headliners, with Stephen Moss in The Guardian writing, "the play and its author are the stars".

History

The play began life as a short radio play written by Agatha Christie as a birthday present for Queen Mary, the consort of King George V. It was broadcast on 30 May 1947 under the name Three Blind Mice. The story drew from the real-life case of Dennis O'Neill, who died after he and his brother Terence suffered extreme abuse while in the foster care of a Shropshire farmer and his wife in 1945.

The play is based on a short story, itself based on the radio play, but Christie asked that the story not be published as long as it ran as a play in the West End of London. The short story has still not been published within the UK but it has appeared in the US in the 1950 collection Three Blind Mice and Other Stories.

When she wrote the play, Christie gave the rights to her grandson Mathew Prichard as a birthday present. In the United Kingdom, only one production of the play in addition to the West End production can be performed annually, and under the contract terms of the play, no film adaptation can be produced until the West End production has been closed for at least six months.

The play had to be renamed at the insistence of Emile Littler who had produced a play called Three Blind Mice in the West End before the Second World War. The suggestion to call it The Mousetrap came from Christie's son-in-law, Anthony Hicks. In William Shakespeare's play Hamlet, "The Mousetrap" is Hamlet's answer to Claudius's inquiry about the name of the play whose prologue and first scene the court has just observed (III, ii). The play is actually The Murder of Gonzago, but Hamlet answers metaphorically, since "the play's the thing" in which he intends to "catch the conscience of the king." The nursery rhyme "Three Blind Mice" or its tune is heard a few times during the play.

The play's longevity has ensured its popularity with tourists from around the world. In 1997, at the initiative of producer Stephen Waley-Cohen, the theatrical education charity Mousetrap Theatre Projects was launched, helping young people experience London's theatre.

The play's storyline is set at "the present", which presumably means England as it was around the time when the play came out in 1952, including postwar continuation of World War II rationing.

Tom Stoppard's 1968 play The Real Inspector Hound parodies many elements of The Mousetrap, including the surprise ending.

Theatrical performances

As a stage play, The Mousetrap had its world premiere at the Theatre Royal, Nottingham, on 6 October 1952. It was originally directed by Peter Cotes, elder brother of John and Roy Boulting, the film directors. Its pre-West End tour then took it to the New Theatre Oxford, the Manchester Opera House, the Royal Court Theatre, Liverpool, the Theatre Royal, Newcastle, the Grand Theatre Leeds and the Alexandra Theatre in Birmingham, before it began its run in London on 25 November 1952 at the Ambassadors Theatre. It ran at this theatre until Saturday, 23 March 1974 when it immediately transferred to the larger St Martin's Theatre, next door, where it reopened on Monday, 25 March thus keeping its "initial run" status. The London run has now exceeded 26,000 performances. The director of the play for many years has been David Turner.

Christie herself did not expect The Mousetrap to run for such a long time.  In her autobiography, she reports a conversation that she had with Peter Saunders: "Fourteen months I am going to give it", says Saunders.  To which Christie replies, "It won't run that long.  Eight months perhaps.  Yes, I think eight months." When it broke the record for the longest run of a play in the West End in September 1957, Christie received a mildly grudging telegram from fellow playwright Noël Coward: "Much as it pains me I really must congratulate you ..." In 2011 (by which time The Mousetrap had been running for almost 59 years), this long-lost document was found by a Cotswold furniture maker who was renovating a bureau purchased by a client from the Christie estate.
By the time of Christie's death in 1976, the play had made more than £3 million. Prichard, who was only 9 when he was given the copyright of the play, set up the Colwinston Charitable Trust in 1995 to use the money from productions of the play. The trust supports charities for the arts, mainly in Wales.

The original West End cast included Richard Attenborough as Detective Sergeant Trotter and his wife Sheila Sim as Mollie Ralston. They took a 10% profit-participation in the production, which was paid for out of their combined weekly salary ("It proved to be the wisest business decision I've ever made ... but foolishly I sold some of my share to open a short-lived Mayfair restaurant called 'The Little Elephant' and later still, disposed of the remainder in order to keep Gandhi afloat.")

Since the retirement of Mysie Monte and David Raven, who each made history by remaining in the cast for more than 11 years, in their roles as Mrs Boyle and Major Metcalf, the cast has been changed annually. The change usually occurs around late November around the anniversary of the play's opening, and was the initiative of Sir Peter Saunders, the original producer. There is a tradition of the retiring leading lady and the new leading lady cutting a "Mousetrap cake" together.

The play has also made theatrical history by having an original "cast member" survive all the cast changes since its opening night. The late Deryck Guyler can still be heard, via a recording, reading the radio news bulletin in the play to this present day. The set was changed in 1965 and 1999, but one prop survives from the original opening – the clock which sits on the mantelpiece of the fireplace in the main hall.

Notable milestones in the play's history include:
 6 October 1952 – First performance at the Theatre Royal, Nottingham
 25 November 1952 – First West End performance at the Ambassadors Theatre
 22 April 1955 – 1,000th performance
 13 September 1957 – Longest-ever run of a "straight" play in the West End
 12 April 1958 – Longest-ever run of a show in the West End with 2,239 performances (the previous holder was Chu Chin Chow)
 9 December 1964 – 5,000th performance
 23 March 1974 – Final performance at the Ambassadors Theatre
 25 March 1974 –  The play transfers to the St Martin's Theatre
 17 December 1976 – 10,000th performance
 16 December 2000 – 20,000th performance
 25 November 2002 – 50th anniversary; a special performance was attended by Queen Elizabeth II and Prince Philip, Duke of Edinburgh.
 18 November 2012 – 25,000th performance; starred Patrick Stewart, Julie Walters, Hugh Bonneville and Iain Glen.

In May 2001 (during the London production's 49th year, and to mark the 25th anniversary of Christie's death) the cast gave a semi-staged Sunday performance at the Palace Theatre, Westcliff-on-Sea as a guest contribution to the Agatha Christie Theatre Festival 2001, a twelve-week history-making cycle of all of Agatha Christie's plays presented by Roy Marsden's New Palace Theatre Company.

Performances at the St. Martin's Theatre were halted on 16 March 2020, along with all other West End shows, during the COVID-19 pandemic in the United Kingdom. The Mousetrap re-opened on 17 May 2021 after 14 months without performances.

Other stagings

A staging at the Toronto Truck Theatre in Toronto, Ontario, that opened on 19 August 1977 became Canada's longest running show, before finally closing on 18 January 2004 after a run of twenty-six years and over 9,000 performances.

On 18 November 2012, both the 25,000th performance and the 60th year of the production were marked by a special charity performance which featured Hugh Bonneville, Patrick Stewart, Julie Walters and Miranda Hart. The money raised by the performance went towards Mousetrap Theatre Projects.

During the Diamond Anniversary year of Mousetrap a touring production visited regional theatres for the first time in its history, whilst the London run continued uninterrupted.

The play has also been presented internationally: in 2013 in Singapore, Kuala Lumpur and Bangkok by the British Theatre Playhouse. 
The play has been staged in Queensland, Australia several times. In September 2011, it was staged at The Mousetrap Theatre in Redcliffe, the theatre group having been named after Christie's play. From July to August 2019, the Toowoomba Repertory Theatre Society performed the play in their home city. In November 2022, The Mousetrap was performed in Brisbane, the State's capital. In December 2022, after more than 70 years, the first Broadway production of The Mousetrap was announced to be staged in 2023 with an all-American cast.

Characters 
 Mollie Ralston – Proprietor of Monkswell Manor, and wife of Giles.
 Giles Ralston – Husband of Mollie who runs Monkswell Manor with his wife.
 Christopher Wren – The first guest to arrive at the hotel, Wren is a hyperactive young man who acts in a very peculiar manner.  He admits he is running away from something, but refuses to say what. Wren claims to have been named after the architect of the same name by his parents.
 Mrs Boyle – A critical older woman who is pleased by nothing she observes.
 Major Metcalf – Retired from the army, little is known about Major Metcalf.
 Miss Casewell – A strange, aloof, masculine woman who speaks offhandedly about the horrific experiences of her childhood.
 Mr Paravicini – A man of unknown provenance, who turns up claiming his car has overturned in a snowdrift.  He appears to be affecting a foreign accent and artificially aged with make-up.
 Detective Sergeant Trotter – The detective. He arrives in a snow storm and questions the proprietors and guests.
 Voice on the radio – source of news relevant to the story

Twist ending and tradition of secrecy

The murderer's identity is divulged near the end of the play, in a twist ending that is unusual for playing with the very basis of the traditional whodunnit formula, where the cliché is that the detective solves the crime and exposes the remaining plot secrets. By tradition, at the end of each performance, audiences are asked not to reveal the identity of the killer to anyone outside the theatre, to ensure that the end of the play is not spoilt for future audiences.

Christie was always upset by the plots of her works being revealed in reviews. In 2010, her grandson Mathew Prichard, who receives the royalties from the play, said he was "dismayed" to learn from The Independent that the ending to The Mousetrap had been described in the play's Wikipedia article.

Duncan Leatherdale of BBC News contrasted the play to other works like Psycho and The Sixth Sense, where the plot twist has been revealed and became itself an element of popular culture.

Plot 

The play is set in the Great Hall of Monkswell Manor, Berkshire, in what Christie described as "the present".

Act I
Act I opens with the murder of a woman named Maureen Lyon, played out in sound only. The action then moves to Monkswell Manor, recently converted to a guesthouse and run by a young couple, Mollie and Giles Ralston.  While waiting for the guests to arrive, Mollie listens to a radio report about the Lyon murder, which notes that police are looking for a man in a dark overcoat, observed near the scene.

Their four guests arrive. Christopher Wren is an unkempt, flighty young man. Giles reacts strongly to Wren with instant dislike and Mollie with instinctual trust. Mrs Boyle and Major Metcalf then arrive together in a taxi from the station. Mrs Boyle complains about many things; Metcalf is an amiable ex-military man.  Miss Casewell, a mannish young woman, is the last of the booked guests to arrive, before an unexpected fifth party appears. Identifying himself in a foreign accent as Mr Paravicini, he tells the Ralstons his car has overturned in a snowdrift. He remarks that the snow has blocked the roads and that the denizens of the house are trapped. Uneasy about Paravicini's manner, Mollie nevertheless places him in the last remaining room.

The next afternoon the guest house proves to be snowed in, and the residents are restless. Mollie answers the telephone to Superintendent Hogben of the Berkshire Police. Hogben tells her that he is dispatching Sergeant Trotter to the guest house, and that the Ralstons must listen carefully to what Trotter has to tell them. The Ralstons wonder what they could have done to garner police attention.

Trotter appears at the door on a pair of skis and Major Metcalf discovers that the phone has stopped working.

Trotter explains he has been sent in regard to the murder of Maureen Lyon. In a story loosely based on the real Dennis O'Neill case, the dead woman and her husband had mistreated their three foster children, resulting in the death of the youngest. Both adults were imprisoned for their actions; the husband died in gaol, while the wife served her sentence and had been released, only to be found strangled. Police suspect the elder boy of the abused children, who would now be twenty-two, of being the killer.

Trotter reveals that a notebook found at the murder scene contained the address of Monkswell Manor and the words "Three Blind Mice". A note reading "This is the First" was pinned to the woman's body. The police have sent Trotter to find out how the Ralstons' guesthouse is connected to the murder and whether the residents are in danger. Both Giles and Mollie deny a connection to the case, though Mollie is ill at ease answering Trotter's questions and quickly excuses herself. Trotter asks each of the guests to explain why they are at Monkswell Manor and any connection they have to the foster children. All five guests deny any personal knowledge of the case.

While Trotter and Giles tour the house, Major Metcalf confronts Mrs Boyle, revealing that she was one of the magistrates who had assigned the children to the foster parents. Mrs Boyle acknowledges this but denies that she has any responsibility for what eventually happened to the children there.

As the evening wears on, Giles and Mollie become suspicious of each other while the guests snipe at one another. Sergeant Trotter traces the phone wire to find out if it has been cut. Mrs Boyle wanders back into the now-empty room and listens to the radio. The opening notes of "Three Blind Mice" are heard whistled by an unknown party and Mrs Boyle responds without alarm, speaking to the person only she can see. Suddenly, the lights go out and a scuffle is heard. Moments later, Mollie walks into the room and turns on the lights, only to find Mrs Boyle dead on the floor.

Act II
Ten minutes after Mollie finds Mrs Boyle dead of strangulation, Sergeant Trotter takes charge of the household. All the remaining residents are gathered in one room as he attempts to sort out the events of the evening. A shaken Mollie Ralston cannot provide him with any useful clues; the only thing she is sure she observed was the radio blaring. Frustrated, Trotter points out that their lives continue to be in danger; a third murder could very well happen, given the notes left with Maureen Lyon. He insists that everyone tell him where they were when Mrs Boyle was murdered. As each person recounts his or her whereabouts, Trotter takes them to account for inconsistencies or weaknesses in their stories. Finally, he declares that everyone in the house had the opportunity to commit the murder, since each of them was alone at the time. Giles counters that while seven people in the house lack alibis, only one fits the description of the man the police suspect to be the murderer: Christopher Wren. Wren insists that it is all a frame-up, and Trotter acknowledges that he lacks any evidence pointing to Wren in particular.

Mollie later pulls Trotter aside; Trotter says that while the police suspect the elder boy to be the killer, the dead boy also had relatives and loved ones who might be interested in revenge: the children's father, an army sergeant, for example; or the dead boy's sister, who would now be a young woman. Trotter notes that Metcalf or Paravicini could be the father, Miss Casewell or Mollie could be the sister, and Giles could be the elder boy. Mollie, aghast, objects to the notion that either she or Giles could be a murderer, but Trotter forces her to admit that they know little about each other's pasts.

Mollie soon finds herself in conversation with Christopher Wren, who confesses that he is actually an army deserter hiding from his past under a false name. Mollie acknowledges that she, too, is running away from her past. Despite the trust Christopher and Mollie are forming, he and Giles each suspect the other and nearly come to blows over Mollie. The situation is only defused by the arrival of Paravicini, who tells the company that Trotter's skis are missing.

Trotter again calls an assembly of the household, declaring that he now intends to check the alibis everyone provided to him after Mrs Boyle's murder. They will re-enact the murder, with each member of the household acting out another's alibi. Trotter's hope is that while most of the alibis will be verified, one will be proved impossible. Each person is to go to his or her assigned position and stay there until summoned back by Trotter. The household obediently disperses, leaving Trotter alone onstage.

Identity of the murderer 

After the role-players scatter, Trotter sits for a moment before calling for Mollie. He tells her that she has risked extreme danger by not identifying herself to him; he now knows that she was once the schoolteacher of the doomed Corrigan children. She failed to answer a letter the younger boy sent her at the time, begging to be rescued from the farm. Mollie protests that she had been seriously ill when the letter arrived and was unable to even read it until well after the boy was dead. To this day, she says, she is haunted by her failure to help the children out of their circumstances.

Trotter takes a gun out of his pocket and points it at Mollie, telling her that she had only assumed him to be a policeman based on the telephone call. He had in fact impersonated Hogben, then cut the telephone wires himself upon arriving at the house. Trotter is actually Georgie, the elder Corrigan brother, and he intends to take his revenge on Mollie. Falling back into the demeanour of a wounded child who never grew up, he drops his gun and begins to strangle Mollie, but is stopped by the sudden appearance of Miss Casewell. She calls him by name and reveals that she is his long-lost sister Kathy, come to take him somewhere safe. Major Metcalf, who accompanied Miss Casewell into the room, summons Giles and tells the frightened innkeepers that he had known all along that Trotter was not a policeman – because Metcalf himself is one, having arranged to take the place of the real Metcalf after discovering the "Three Blind Mice" notebook on Maureen Lyon.

Critical reception
The play made little stir in the review pages of the British press when it opened. The Manchester Guardian commented that it was "a middling piece" with "less in it than meets the eye ... Coincidence is stretched unreasonably." The critic commented that the characters were "built entirely of clichés". The reviewer in The Times was more favourably disposed to the characters, calling them "nicely assorted, individually labelled and readily identified", and found the plot "elaborately skilful." In The Daily Express, John Barber praised "the atmosphere of shuddering suspense" but thought some of the characters "too obvious by half". In The Illustrated London News, J. C. Trewin commented that those who failed to spot the killer would probably call the plot "preposterous and over-burdened", but those who succeeded might be more kindly disposed.

Publication history
The play was published as a paperback by Samuel French Ltd as French's Acting Edition No. 153 in 1954 and is still in print. It was first published in hardback in The Mousetrap and Other Plays by G. P. Putnam's Sons in 1978.

Film and television versions
In 1959, it was announced that Edward Small, who had produced Witness for the Prosecution for the screen, was to make a film version of the play in co-production with Victor Saville for United Artists. Tyrone Power and Maria Schell were named as leads. However, no film version resulted. In 1960, the Bengali author Premendra Mitra directed a film Chupi Chupi Aashey, based on the radio play and short story. In 1990, Russian film director Samson Samsonov directed a film titled Мышеловка (Myshelovka, English: The Mousetrap) at Mosfilm. The script by Vladimir Basov is based on Christie's play.

In 2022, the story of a British-American film See How They Run was set in St Martin's Theatre and concerned in-story actors of The Mousetrap, following murders of personnel involved in the production of and linked to the play.

References

Further reading

External links

 
 
 2004 review in The Stage

1952 plays
Plays by Agatha Christie
West End plays
British plays adapted into films